The Order of Miloš the Great, was an Order of the Kingdom of Serbia.  Founded in 1898 by King Alexander I of Serbia, the order was named in honor of Miloš Obrenović, the leader of the Second Serbian Uprising, and founder of the House of Obrenović.  The order was suppressed in 1903 by King Peter I of Serbia, a member of the competing House of Karađorđević.

References

Orders, decorations, and medals of Serbia
Awards established in 1898
Awards disestablished in 1903